Randy Rogers is a Bahamian professional football manager.

Career
In 1987, he coached the Bahamas national football team.

References

Year of birth missing (living people)
Living people
Bahamian football managers
Bahamas national football team managers
Place of birth missing (living people)